Hazaribagh Sadar subdivision is an administrative subdivision of the Hazaribagh district in the North Chotanagpur division in the state of Jharkhand, India.

History
During the period of Muslim rule, the thickly forested plateau area was ruled by big estates such as Ramgarh, Kunda, Kendi, Chai and Kharagdiha. With the East India Company acquiring the diwani of Bengal, Bihar and Odisha in 1765, it derived the right to collect revenue from the estates of Ramgarh, Kharagdiha, Kendi and Kunda. After the Kol uprising in 1831, the British changed the administrative structure of the area. The parganas of Ramgarh, Kharagdiha, Kendi and Kunda were made a part of the South West Frontier Agency and formed into a division named Hazaribagh with Hazaribagh as the administrative headquarter. In 1854 the designation of the South West Frontier Agency was changed to Chutia Nagpur and it began to be administered as a non-regulation province under the Lt. Governor of Bihar.

Administrative set up
Hazaribagh district is divided in to two subdivisions – Hazaribagh Sadar and Barhi. There are 16 CD blocks and 15 revenue anchals with 1 statutory town, 16 census towns, 1308 villages and 257 are gram panchayats in the district.

Details of the subdivision are as follows:

Note: Data calculated on the basis of census data for CD blocks and may vary a little against unpublished official data.

Demographics
According to the 2011 Census of India data, Hazaribagh Sadar subdivision, in Hazaribagh district, had a total population of 1,210.661. There were 623,236 (51%) males and 587,425 (49%) females. Scheduled castes numbered 205,973 (17.01%) and scheduled tribes numbered 105,076 (8.68%). Literacy rate was 70.91% (for the population below 6 years).

See also – List of Jharkhand districts ranked by literacy rate

Police stations
Police stations in Hazaribagh Sadar subdivision are at:
 Sadar 
Muffasil
Mahila and SC/ST
Barkagaon
Bishnugarh
Charhi
Churchu
Daru
Gidi
Ichak
Katkamsandi
Keredari

Blocks
Community development blocks in the Hazaribagh Sadar subdivision are:

Economy

Konar Dam

Coalmining
Coalmining started early in this area. Gidi was an old mining centre. Many of the other mining areas that were earlier a part of the Hazaribagh Sadar subdivision subsequently became parts of new neighbouring districts on their formation. New mining areas are coming up around Keredari and Barkagaon. As of 2021, five operational areas of Central Coalfields Limited were located partially in this subdivision: Amrapali & Chandragupta Area with Chandragupta open cast project coming up as a major project, Barka Sayal Area, Argada Area, Kuju Area, and Hazaribagh Area.

Education
In 2011, in the Hazaribagh Sadar subdivision out of a total 703 inhabited villages there were 214 villages with pre-primary schools, 641 villages with primary schools, 346 villages with middle schools, 104 villages with secondary schools, 20 villages with senior secondary schools, 2 villages/ census towns with general degree college, 1 village with medical college, 3 villages with non-formal training centres,  7 villages with vocational training centres/ITI, 79 villages with no educational facility, 1 statutory city with 1 university, 1 engineering college, 1 management institution, 1 polytechnic.
.*Senior secondary schools are also known as Inter colleges in Jharkhand

Educational institutions
The following institutions are located in Hazaribagh Sadar subdivision:
Vinoba Bhave University was established at Hazaribagh in 1972.
St. Columba's College was established at Hazaribagh in 1899.
Annada College was established at Hazaribagh in 1979.
Markham College of Commerce was established at Hazaribagh in 1974.
Krishna Ballav Women's College was established at Hazaribagh in 1963.
Ghanshyam Mehta Institute at Ichak was established in 2007.
Karnapura College was established in 1992 at Barkagaon.
Sheikh Bhikhari Medical College was established at Kolghatti in 2019.

(Information about degree colleges with proper reference may be added here)

Healthcare
In 2011, in the Hazaribagh Sadar subdivision there were 35 villages with primary health centres, 84 villages with primary health subcentres, 30 villages with maternity and child welfare centres, 21 villages with allopathic hospitals, 22 villages with dispensaries, 20 villages with veterinary hospitals, 13 villages with family welfare centres, 74 villages with medicine shops, 1 statutory city with 4 nursing homes.
.*Private medical practitioners, alternative medicine etc. not included

Medical facilities
CCL - AKC, Gidi A at Gidi with 31 beds has 6 general duty medical officers and 1 specialist. Among the medical facilities it has is: X-ray machine. It has 3 ambulances.

(Anybody having referenced information about location of government/ private medical facilities may please add it here)

References

Sub-divisions in Jharkhand